Grace Santos may refer to:

Grace Santos, character in The 24 Hour Woman
Grace Santos, character in Aso ni San Roque
Grace Santos (producer)